Cassels is a surname, and may refer to:

 Andrew Cassels (1969-), Canadian former ice hockey player
Elsie Cassels (1864–1938), Scottish born naturalist and Canadian ornithologist
John Franklin Cassels (1852-1930), member of the Mississippi House of Representatives
 John William Scott Cassels (1922-2015), English mathematician
 James Cassels (disambiguation), several people
 Richard Cassels (1690-1751), German architect who worked in Ireland
 Thomas F. Cassels (c. 1845-1903), African-American legislator from Tennessee during Reconstruction
 Walter Richard Cassels (1826-1907), author
 William Wharton Cassels (1858-1925), missionary bishop

See also
 Cassel (disambiguation)
 Cassell (disambiguation)
 Cassells
 Culzean Castle
 Kassel
 Clan Kennedy